Lynn Theresa Garafola (born December 12, 1946) is an American dance historian, linguist, critic, curator, lecturer, and educator. A prominent researcher and writer with broad interests in the field of dance history, she is acknowledged as the leading expert on the Ballets Russes de Serge Diaghilev (1909–1929), the most influential company in twentieth-century theatrical dance.

Early life and education
Born in New York City, Lynn spent her early years in the Upper Manhattan neighborhood of Washington Heights. Her parents were Louis Salvatore Garafola, a printer, and Rose Jean (Marchione) Garafola, whose surname is a Southern Italian corruption of garofalo, meaning "carnation."  As a child Lynn studied ballet and violin with teachers from the Armenian diaspora, including Madame Seda Suny, a well-known dance teacher in the neighborhood, and spent leisure time in reading, knitting and stitchery, acting, and swimming. Madame Seda, who was always considered "Russian" by her students, introduced the young girl to the art form that would become one of the guiding passions of her life. After six years of elementary school, she entered the seventh grade of Hunter College High School, an elite, all-girls school with high academic standards and a strong arts program. There, her Latin teacher, Irving Kizner, sparked her facility in languages, which would become another lifelong interest. While in high school, she also studied modern dance with Alice Halpern and, in her senior year, took occasional classes in "jazz dance" with Alvin Ailey, which was really Horton technique accompanied by drumming.

Upon graduation from high school in 1964, Garafola found her first summer job, as a salesgirl at Arnold Constable's flagship store in New York, the "Palace of Trade" on Broadway at West 19th Street. That autumn, she entered the freshman class of Barnard College (class of 1968), the prestigious women's college associated with Columbia University, on Morningside Heights in Manhattan. As a budding linguist and an amateur actress, she became attached to faculty members who were émigrés from the Spanish Civil War and who, to Garafola's delight, staged plays in Spanish, in which she often appeared. Besides Spanish, her major field, her course of study included classes in French and Italian as well as general academics. Throughout her college years, she continued to study dance and to take part in theatrical productions. She graduated from Barnard with a baccalaureate degree (A.B.) in 1968.

The recipient of a Fulbright Fellowship, Lynn spent the following year in Quito, Ecuador, studying Latin American literature and teaching English. Then, after a year in the American Midwest and some time in Mexico, she returned to New York, where she found employment in 1970 as a staff translator at the Berlitz Translation Service in midtown Manhattan. Deciding to pursue graduate studies, she entered the doctoral program in Spanish at the Graduate Center of City University of New York. She soon switched her field from Spanish to comparative literature, which she found more intellectually stimulating, and began regular attendance at dance performances in the city. She eventually earned a master's degree (M.Phil.) in 1979. More years of study followed, as her interest in dance history grew to become her primary focus. With a dissertation entitled "Art and Enterprise in Diaghilev's Ballets Russes," she earned a doctoral degree (Ph.D.) in 1985.

Academic career

While still a graduate student, Garafola began her academic career in February 1975 as a part-time lecturer in the Department of Comparative Literature at Brooklyn College, a job she held until June 1977. After a hiatus of almost ten years, she was again a part-time lecturer, back uptown at Columbia University during the summers of 1985 and 1986. In September 1988, she was appointed adjunct assistant professor in the School of the Arts at Columbia, and in September 2000, she moved across Broadway at West 116th Street to the Department of Dance at Barnard, where she was an adjunct professor on a half-time schedule. In July 2003, she became a term professor, and in September 2006 she was named a full professor of dance. Granted tenure in 2007, she occupied this position until July 2017, when she became Professor Emerita. She served as co-chair of the Department of Dance at Barnard from July 2014 to July 2016.  Until her retirement, she was a non-voting member of the Department of History at Columbia and a faculty member of the university's Harriman Institute, which is devoted to Russian, Eurasian, and East European studies.  She continues to serve on orals and dissertation committees in History and Theatre, and remains active in the Harriman Institute.

An autodidact in dance history, Garafola has taught numerous courses at Barnard in Western theatrical dance from the Renaissance to the 1960s. She has also directed numerous projects on nineteenth- and twentieth-century topics in ballet as well as in modern, contemporary, African-American, social, and national dance forms. She has served on Ph.D. dissertation committees in history, theater, and music at Columbia, in performance studies, French, and History at New York University, in French at Johns Hopkins University, in history at Northwestern University, in music at Princeton University, in Visual Arts at the University of Leeds, and in the Faculty of Arts and Social Sciences at the University of Sydney. She has a deep commitment to guiding and developing dance history scholars in work that is empirically rich and that opens new windows onto the past. In 2011 she founded the 
University Seminar in Studies in Dance, which she still directs.

Writing about dance
After Garafola returned to New York City in 1970 and began to attend performances by the American Ballet Theatre, she fell in love with the nineteenth-century classic ballets: Swan Lake, Giselle, Coppélia, The Nutcracker, and The Sleeping Beauty. Seeing these works reignited her childhood interest in dance, and attendance at performances by the Joffrey Ballet, the New York City Ballet, and various modern dance companies led to a growing fascination with the history of dance, particularly ballet. In her readings in comparative literature, she chanced across an account of the meeting of Marcel Proust and James Joyce at a 1922 cast party for the Ballets Russes. Its description of impresario Sergei Diaghilev captured her attention, and she began to think about writing her doctoral dissertation on the influence of the Ballets Russes on intellectuals and writers of imaginative literature. Trained as a literary scholar, she reconceptualized her dissertation topic to focus on the history of the Ballets Russes itself, thus transforming herself from a literary comparatist into a historian of performing arts.

In time, Garafola's dissertation metamorphosed into a history book, Diaghilev's Ballets Russes, published in 1989. This was followed by a number of edited works and a torrent of articles in scholarly journals, anthologies, encyclopedias, newspapers, and popular magazines as well as dozens of book reviews, program notes, interviews, public lectures, scholarly presentations, and other writings. She has also made many appearances on television and public radio that have resulted in written transcripts of her commentary and addresses. Her current project focuses on the life and work of choreographer Bronislava Nijinska, younger sister of Vaslav Nijinsky and member of Diaghilev's Ballets Russes. All of Garafola's writings have been motivated by her belief in the centrality of dance and its importance to scholarship and the cultural life of a city, a nation, and communities throughout the world.

Publications
Among the published works of which Garafola is the author, editor, or translator are the following books, articles in other books, and scholarly journal articles. In addition to these are scores of book reviews and papers included in the proceedings of academic conferences and meetings.

Books
 1989. Diaghilev's Ballets Russes. New York: Oxford University Press.
 1991. André Levinson on Dance: Writings from Paris in the Twenties. Edited and with an introduction by Joan Acocella and Lynn Garafola. Middletown, Conn.: Wesleyan University Press. Includes a bibliography of Levinson's writings.
 1991. The Diaries of Marius Petipa. Translated from the Russian and edited by Lynn Garafola, with an introduction and chronology of works. Studies in Dance History, a monograph series, no. 3.1, published by the Society of Dance History Scholars.
 The Origins of the Bolero School. Edited by Lynn Garafola. Studies in Dance History, a monograph series, no. 4.1, published by the Society of Dance History Scholars. This is an English-language version of the Spanish original, edited by Javier Suárez-Parajes and Xoán M. Carreira, and translated by Elizabeth Coonrod Martinez, Aurelia de la Vega, and Lynn Garafola.
 1994. Of, By, and For the People: Dancing on the Left in the 1930s. Edited by Lynn Garafola. Studies in Dance History, a monograph series, no 5.1, published by the Society of Dance History Scholars.
 1997. Rethinking the Sylph: New Perspectives on the Romantic Ballet. Edited and introduced by Lynn Garafola. Middletown, Conn.: Wesleyan University Press.
 1998. José Limon: An Unfinished Memoir. Edited by Lynn Garafola. Middletown, Conn.: Wesleyan University Press.
 1999. Dance for a City: Fifty Years of the New York City Ballet. Edited by Lynn Garafola with Eric Foner. New York: Columbia University Press.
 1999. The Ballets Russes and Its World. Edited by Lynn Garafola and Nancy Van Norman Baer. New Haven, Conn.: Yale University Press.
 2005. Legacies of Twentieth-Century Dance. Middletown, Conn.: Wesleyan University Press.
 2011. Sergei Diaghilev and the Ballets Russes: A Tribute to the First Hundred Years. Annual issue, Experiment: Journal of Russian Culture, vol. 17. Edited by Lynn Garafola and John E. Bowlt and published by the Institute of Modern Russian Culture, University of Southern California, Los Angeles.
 Forthcoming. La Nijinska: Choreographer of Ballet’s Avant-Garde. (working title).

Online volumes
 2015. Russian Movement Culture of the 1920s and 1930s.  Edited volume based on a symposium organized with Catharine Theimer Nepomnyashchy, Harriman Institute, Columbia University, 12-14 Feb. 2015.  Published by the Harriman Institute in fall 2015.
 2017. Dancing the Cold War.  Edited volume based on a symposium sponsored by the Harriman, Institute, Columbia University, 16-18 Feb. 2017.  Published by the Harriman Institute in winter 2018.
 2018. Arthur Mitchell: Harlem’s Ballet Trailblazer. Exhibition website created for the Rare Book & Manuscript Library, Columbia University, in tandem with the Wallach Art Gallery exhibition of the same title, 2018.

Selected articles in other books
 1983. "Les Soirées de Paris." In Lydia Lopokova, edited by Milo Keynes. London: Weidenfeld & Nicolson.
 1988. "Toward an American Dance: Dance in the City, 1940–1965." In New York: Culture Capital of the World, 1940–1965, edited by Leonard Wallock. New York: Rizzoli.
 1988. "The Ballets Russes in America." In The Art of Enchantment: Diaghilev's Ballets Russes, 1909–1929, edited by Nancy Van Norman Baer. New York: Universe Books.
 1995. "The Ballets Suédois and the Ballets Russes." In Paris Modern: The Swedish Ballet, 1920–1925, edited by Nancy Van Norman Baer. San Francisco: Fine Arts Museums of San Francisco.
 2001. "The Choreography of Le Tricorne." In Los Ballets Russes de Diaghilev y España (The Ballets Russes of Diaghilev and Spain), edited by Yvan Nommick and Antonio Alvarez Cañibano. Madrid: Centro de Documentación de Música y Danza.
 2003. "Ballet: Reinvention and Continuity over Five Centuries." In The Living Dance: An Anthology of Essays on Movement and Culture, edited by Judith Chazin-Bennahum. Dubuque, Iowa: Kendall Hunt. 
 2005. "Agrippina Vaganova and Her Times." Introduction to Vaganova: A Dance Journey from Petersburg to Leningrad, by Vera Krasovskaya, translated from the Russian by Vera M. Siegel. Gainesville: University Press of Florida.
 2007. "Voice of the Zeitgeist: Sally Banes and Her Times." Introduction to Before, Between, After: Three Decades of Dance Writing, by Sally Banes. Madison: University of Wisconsin Press.
 2009. "Workshop of the Muses: Diaghilev and Monte Carlo." In A Feast of Wonders: Sergei Diaghilev and the Ballets Russes, edited by John E. Bowlt. Milan:  Skira Rizzoli.
 2011. "Astonish Me!: Diaghilev, Massine, and the Experimentalist Tradition." In Ballets Russes in Australia and Beyond, edited by Mark Carroll. Adelaide, S.A.: Wakefield Press.
 2011. "Abstraction and the Dance: Bronislava Nijinska's Les Noces." In Arturo Herrera: Les Noces (The Wedding), exhibition catalog, edited by Gabriela Rangel. New York: American Society.
 2013. Diaghilev’s Ballets Russes: A New Kind of Company.  In Avatar of Modernity: The Rite of Spring Reconsidered. Ed. Hermann Danuser and Heidy Zimmermann. London: Paul Sacher Foundation/Boosey & Hawkes, 2013.
 2014. "Chernota delaet roscherk v dyshe moei" (Blackness makes a stroke on my soul).  Publication of the original Russian text of Bronislava Nijinska’s 1919-22 diary and her 1918-19 treatise School and Theater of Movement, with an accompanying essay.  In Mnemozina: dokumenty I facty iz istorii otechestvennogo teatra XX veka. Ed. V.V. Ivanov.  Moscow: Indrik 2014.
 2014. “Foreward. Like a Bomb Going Off: Leonid Yakobson and Ballet as Resistance in Soviet Russia, by Janice Ross. New Haven: Yale University Press, 2014.
 2014. In Search of Eden: Bronislava Nijinska in California. In Kinetic Los Angeles: Russian Emigrés in the City of Self-Transformation. Ed. Lorin Johnson. Leiden: Brill, 2014. Special issue of Experiment: Journal of Russian Culture 20 (2014).
 2016 “H.P.: A Lost Dance of the Americas.” In Dance: American Art 1830-1960. Ed. Jane Dini.  Detroit Institute of Art/Yale University Press, 2016.	
 2017 “A Century of Rites: The Making of an Avant-Garde Tradition.” In The Rite of Spring at 100. Ed. Severine Neff, Maureen Carr, and Gretchen Horlacher, with John Reef.  Bloomington: Indiana University Press, 2017.
 2019. “Lincoln Kirstein, Man of the People.” In catalogue of Lincoln Kirstein’s Modern, 17 Mar.-30 June 2019. New York: Museum of Modern Art, 2019.

Selected journal articles
 1982. "Hollywood and the Myth of the Working Class." Radical America (Somerville, Mass., January–February 1980).
 1985–1986. "The Travesty Dancer in Nineteenth-Century Ballet." Dance Research Journal (New York) 17.2 (Fall 1985) and 18.1 (Spring 1986). Reprinted in Crossing the Stage: Controversies on Cross-Dressing, edited by Lesley Ferris (London: Routledge, 1993).
 1988. "Mark Morris and the Feminine Mystique." Ballet Review (New York) 16.3 (December 1988).
 1995. "Forgotten Interlude: Eurhythmic Dancers at the Paris Opera." Dance Research (Edinburgh) 13.1 (Summer 1995).
 1995. "A las Márganes del Occidente: El Destino Transpirenaico de la Danza Española desde la Época del Romanticismo" ("On the Margins of the West: The Destiny of Spanish Dance beyond the Pyrenees since the Era of Romanticism"). Cairón: Revista del Estudios de Danza (Alcalá de Henares, Madrid, 1995).
 2002. "Dollars for Dance: Lincoln Kirstein, City Center, and the Rockefeller Foundation." Dance Chronicle: Studies in Dance and Related Arts (New York) 25.1 (Spring 2002).
 2006. "Making Dances: Process and Practice in Diaghilev's Ballets Russes." Culture Teatrali: Studi, Interventi e Scrittore sullo Spettacolo (Bologna) 14 (Spring 2006), special issue, edited by Rosella Mazzaglia. Reprinted in Denkfiguren: Performatives zwischen Bewegen, Schreiben und Erfinden (Conceptions of Interactions between Movement, Writing, and Creativity), edited by Nicole Haitzinger and Karin Fenbock (Munich: Epodium Verlag, 2010).
 2006. "Serguéi Diághilev: La Creación del Ballet Moderno" ("Sergei Diaghilev: The Creation of Modern Ballet"), La Tempestad (Barcelona) 8.50 (October 2006).
 2011. “Crafted by Many Hands: Re-Reading Bronislava Nijinska’s Early Memoirs.” Dance Research (Edinburgh) 29.1 (Summer 2011).
 2011. “An Amazon of the Avant-Garde: Bronislava Nijinska in Revolutionary Russia.” Dance Research (Edinburgh) 29. 2 (Winter 2011).
 2015. “Interlude oubliée: la danse rythmique à l’Opéra de Paris.” Trans. Marina Nordera.  Recherches en Danse, Jan. 2015.

Lectures and public readings
Garafola has delivered dozens of lectures and public presentations on a great many topics in dance history. Those listed here are but a sampling of this body of work, intended to indicate the breadth of her interests and the extent of her reach.
 1985. "Remaking Ballet in the Diaghilev Era: The Choreographic Revolution of Fokine, Nijinsky, Massine, and Nijinska." The Houston Seminar, Houston, Texas.
 1991. "Nijinsky and Nijinska." Fundaçáo Calouste Gulbenkian, Lisbon.
 1993. "Writing the History of Dance." History Society, Pembroke College, University of Oxford.
 1996. "Léonide Massine: Symphonic Choreographer." New York Public Library for the Performing Arts.
 2000. "George Antheil and the Dance." Great Hall, Cooper Union for the Advancement of Science and Art, New York.
 2002. "Stravinsky and Ida Rubenstein." University of British Columbia, Vancouver.
 2003. "On Your Toes, or The Americanization of George Balanchine." Annual meeting, Popular Culture Association, New Orleans.
 2004. "Balanchine and the Many Roots of Abstraction." Hermitage Theater, Saint Petersburg, Russia.
 2006. "A Model of Female Empowerment: Isadora Duncan and the Early Choreographic Career of Bronislava Nijinska." Harriman Institute, Columbia University, New York.
 2009. "Crossing Borders, Transcending Boundaries: Diaghilev's Ballets Russes and the Birth of Ballet Modernism." Macalester College, Saint Paul, Minnesota.
 2011. "The Ballets Russes and Twentieth-Century Dance." Waseda University, Shinjuku, Tokyo.
 2013. "Making Ballet Modern: Modernism and Diaghilev's Ballets Russes." George Washington University Summer in Paris.
 2013. "A Century of Rites: The Making of an Avant-garde Tradition." Emory University, Atlanta; University of Dayton, Ohio; and Institut fŭr Theaterwissenschaft, Freie Universitãt Berlin.
 2013. “Discourses of Memory:  The Marginalization of Bronislava Nijinska.” Keynote address.  “Gender and Creation in the History of the Performing Arts,” Paris, 14 Dec. 2013.
 2015. "Dancing through Adversity: Bronislava Nijinska's Théâtre de la Danse, 1932–34." Athens, Greece.
2017. "Concealments and Revelations of the First Person:Bronislava Nijinska's Diaries."  Seminério Internacional de História da Dança, Universidade Federal de Goiás, Brazil, 22 Sept. 2017.
 2017. “Amazon of the Avant-Garde on a Global Stage.”  Dance and the Avant-Garde in Central and Eastern Europe, a conference organized by the Adam Mickiewicz Institute.  Lublin, Poland, 16 Nov. 2017. 
 2018. “Bronislava Nijinska y el nacionalismo coreográfico de “Rusia en el extranjero” (Bronislava Nijinska and the Choreographic Nationalism of “Russia Abroad”). XI Jornadas de investigación de danza 2018, Buenos Aires, 7 Sept. 2018.
2018. “Bronislava Nijinska – from Kyiv to Hollywood.”  America House, Kyiv, 10 Nov. 2018.
 2019 “Pilgrimage to an Imagined West: Antiquity and the Early Ballets Russes.” Institute for the Study of the Ancient World, New York, 28 Mar. 2019.
 2019. “The African-American Presence in Postwar American Ballet.”  University of California, Santa Barbara, 29 Apr. 2019.
 2019. “The Long History of Bronislava Nijinska’s Bolero.” Presented at the international conference “Repensar El sombrero de tres picos: cien años después,” Palacio de la Madraza, Granada, 5 July 2019. 
 2020. “Gendered Selves and the Melancholy of Being: Francis Poulenc and Bronislava Nijinska.”  Presented at the symposium “Within and Without: ‘Les Six’ at 100.”  Princeton University, 17 Jan. 2020.	
 2020. “Anna Pavlova: A Ballerina for All.” Presented at the symposium “Ballerina: Fashion’s Modern Muse.” Fashion Institute of Technology (GIT), 6 Mar. 2020.

Exhibitions
 1986. Historical consultant. Bronislava Nijinska: A Dancer's Legacy. Curated by Nancy Van Norman Baer. The Fine Arts Museums of San Francisco.
 1988. Historical consultant. The Art of Enchantment: Diaghilev's Ballets Russes, 1909–1929. The Fine Arts Museums of Sab Francisco.
 1999. Guest curator. Dance for a City: Fifty Years of the New York City Ballet. New-York Historical Society.
 2000. Guest curator. Dance at the White Barn. The White Barn Theater Museum, Westport, Connecticut.
 2004–2005. Guest curator, with Norton Owen. America's Irreplaceable Dance Treasures: The First 100. traveling exhibition sponsored by the Dance Heritage Coalitiob, Washington, D.C., and mounted in four venues: San Francisco Performing Arts Library and Museum (Winter 2004); Blake's Barn, Jacob's Pillow Dance Festival, Beckett, Massachusetts (Summer 2004); Music and Dance Library, Ohio State University (Autumn 2004); and New York Public Library for the Performing Arts (Summer 2005).
 2006–2007. Guest curator, with Patrizia Veroli. 500 Years of Italian Dance: Treasures from the New York Public Library's Cia Fornaroli Collection. New York Public Library for the Performing Arts.
 2008. Guest curator. New York Story: Jerome Robbins and His World. New York Public Library for the Performing Arts.
 2009. Guest curator. Diaghilev's Theater of Marvels: The Ballets Russes and Its Aftermath. New York Public Library for the Performing Arts.
 2018. Guest curator. Arthur Mitchell: Harlem's Ballet Trailblazer. Wallach Art Gallery, Columbia University.

Awards and fellowships
In addition to glowing reviews of her books and accolades from her peers, Garafola has been the recipient of a number of prestigious awards and fellowships. Among them are the following.
 1968–1969. Fellowship. Fulbright Scholar Program, U.S. Department of State, Washington, D.C. For study of the social novel at the University of Quito, Ecuador.
 1978–1979. Fellowship. Social Science Research Council, New York.
 1986–1987. Fellowship. Andrew W. Mellon Foundation, New York. For study at the Heyman Center, Columbia University. (Declined)
 1986–1987. Fellowship in the History of Art and the Humanities. The Getty Foundation, Los Angeles.
 1990. De la Torre Bueno Prize, given by the Dance Perspectives Foundation, New York, in recognition of Diaghilev's Ballets Russes as the outstanding work in dance history for the year 1990.
 1991–1992. Appointment, scholar in residence. Getty Research Institute, Los Angeles.
 1993–1994. Fellowship. National Endowment for the Humanities, Washington, D.C.
 1999. Award, given by the Congress on Research in Dance, New York, in recognition of José Limon: An Unfinished Memoir as the outstanding scholarly dance publication of the year 1999.
 2000. Independent Publisher Book Award, given in recognition of Dance for a City: Fifty Years of the New York City Ballet as the outstanding book in the performing arts.
 2005. Kurt Weill Prize, given by the Kurt Weill Foundation for Music, New York, in recognition of The Ballets Russes and Its World as representative of distinguished scholarship in twentieth-century musical theater.
 2008. Emily Gregory Award, given by the Trustees of Barnard College to a student-nominated candidate recognized for excellence in teaching and for devotion and service to the students of Barnard College.
 2013–2014. Fellowship, in support of "Bronislava Nijinska: A Choreographer's Journey." Dorothy and Lewis B. Cullman Center for Scholars and Writers, New York Public Library for the Performing Arts.
 2013–2014. Fellowship, in support of "Bronislava Nijinska: A Choreographer's Journey." John Simon Guggenheim Memorial Foundation, New York.

Related activities
Since 1988, Garafola has been an active member of the Society of Dance History Scholars, serving as editor of its monograph series Studies in Dance History (1991–98), chair of its fundraising committee (2000–01), chair of its editorial board (2002–04), and a judge on its annual prize committee on several occasions. She has also been active in the Dance Critics Association, the Congress on Research in Dance, the American Association of Teachers of Slavic and East European Languages, and the American Academy of Arts and Sciences. For several years (2000-2004), she was a principal researcher on the Popular Balanchine project of the George Balanchine Foundation, charged with compiling dossiers on the 1936, 1954, and 1982 productions of the Broadway musical On Your Toes, choreographed by Mr. Balanchine. She has also been a panelist and judge in programs sponsored by the National Endowment for the Humanities, the National Endowment for the Arts, the National Academy of Arts and Sciences, the American Council of Learned Societies, the Library of Congress, and various universities, publishers, and other organizations.

Personal life 
In 1980, Garafola married Eric Foner, the Dewitt Clinton Professor of History at Columbia University. They have one daughter, Daria. A former dancer with the Norwegian National Ballet in Oslo, she received a Ph.D. in Art History from Columbia University in 2020 and is currently employed at the Morgan Library and Museum in New York.

References

External links
Lynn Garafola papers, 1985-1992 Jerome Robbins Dance Division, New York Public Library for the Performing Arts.

1946 births
Living people
American dance critics
Dance historians
Barnard College alumni
American women journalists
21st-century American historians
American women historians
American women critics
Journalists from New York City
Historians from New York (state)
21st-century American women writers
Columbia University faculty
Barnard College faculty
Brooklyn College faculty